The San Antonio Talons were a professional arena football team based in San Antonio, Texas. They played in the Arena Football League (AFL). Their home arena was the Alamodome, following their relocation to San Antonio for the 2012 season.

The team was founded in 2000 as the Tulsa Talons of Tulsa, Oklahoma, a charter member of the AFL's defunct developmental league, af2. The Talons played in the af2 for ten seasons, and joined the Arena Football League in 2010 following its reorganization. After the 2011 season the team announced they would relocate to San Antonio. The Talons have won ArenaCup championships in 2003 and 2007, won eight af2 division championships, one AFL division championship, and made a total of eleven playoff appearances.

History

af2 Days
The Talons began in 2000 in Tulsa, Oklahoma as the Tulsa Talons, a charter member of the now-defunct minor league of Arena football Arena Football 2, also known as af2. In 2009 the Talons moved from their original home field at Tulsa Convention Center to the new 18,041 seat arena called the BOK Center.

In terms of victories and championships, the Talons were a successful af2 franchise. The Talons had more wins than any other team in af2 history. The Talons were the first af2 franchise to reach 100 overall franchise victories. During the existence of the league, the Talons did not have a losing season and appeared in all ten af2 playoffs. Also, the Tulsa Talons won two af2 championships, known as the ArenaCup, in the last eight years of the league. The Talons are also the team with the longest streak of consecutive seasons in the AFL system.

Former Head Coach Mitch Allner is the only person in af2 history to win a championship as both player and head coach. In 2004 the Talons were sold to a group led by Henry Primeaux, the owners of automobile dealerships in Oklahoma, and Paul Ross, an investor. In 2009 three new owners were added to the group.

Transition to AFL
In 2010, some af2 teams joined with a handful of AFL teams which had remained in operation after the cancellation of the 2009 season formed a new league that was to be named AF1. The Talons moved from the af2 and joined the league, which became the highest level of indoor American football.  However, the league soon decided to use the former Arena Football League name rather than AF1.

Move to San Antonio
On September 21, 2011, Talons chairman Paul Ross announced the team was moving to San Antonio due to less than desirable attendance and ticket sales. The team was purchased by a group led by California businessman Jason Lohe and the Talons were introduced to the city of San Antonio on September 27, 2011. The Talons then made a big play in free agency by signing veteran quarterback Aaron Garcia, who was fresh off of leading the Jacksonville Sharks to their first ever ArenaBowl victory. Despite AFL tradition to adopt previous AFL team names and identities for new teams in previous markets, the Talons chose to keep their nickname and not adopt the identity of the long-defunct San Antonio Force, due in part to the preexistence of the Georgia Force (a similar issue forced the Pittsburgh Power to adopt its current name instead of the Gladiators). In March 2012, Lynd Sports LLC, became a partial owner of the Talons. Just days later, Lohe was forced to return to California with family issues, and David Lynd became the principal owner of the franchise. 

In December 2013, Lynd was sued for breach of contract when his real estate company (Lynd Company) failed to follow through on a $1.7 million purchase. On January 9, 2014, it was reported that the league had seized control of the franchise, and began immediately looking for new ownership.  The league has been in talks with Spurs Sports & Entertainment, owners of the NBA's San Antonio Spurs, WNBA's San Antonio Stars and San Antonio Rampage hockey team, but neither AFL commissioner Jerry Kurz nor a Spurs spokeswoman could comment about the talks at the time.

On October 13, 2014, the AFL announced that the Talons would not be returning to play in 2015 and are dormant.

Notable players

Final roster

Individual awards

All-Arena players
The following Talons players were named to All-Arena Teams:
FB Odie Armstrong, Mykel Benson
WR Donovan Morgan
DL Gabe Nyenhuis, Victor DeGrate, Tim McGill, Joe Sykes
LB Steve Watson, Jamar Ransom (2)
DB J. C. Neal, Fred Shaw, Kelvin Rodgers

All-Ironman players
The following Talons players were named to All-Ironman Teams:
WR/KR Jeff Hughley

Notable coaches

Head coaches

Staff

Season-by-season

References

External links

 Official Website
 Official Message Board

 
2012 establishments in Texas
2014 disestablishments in Texas